GASU or Gasu may refer to:

Garda Air Support Unit, a unit of the Garda Síochána
Kathu language, a Lolo-Burmese language also romanized "Gasu"